Charles Glacier is a small, steep glacier draining the south side of Borg Mountain, in the Borg Massif of Queen Maud Land. It was mapped by Norwegian cartographers from surveys and from air photos by the Norwegian–British–Swedish Antarctic Expedition (NBSAE) (1949–52) and named for Charles W. Swithinbank, a glaciologist with NBSAE.

See also
 List of glaciers in the Antarctic
 Glaciology

References
 

Glaciers of Queen Maud Land
Princess Martha Coast